Aurangabad East Assembly constituency is one of the six constituencies of Maharashtra Vidhan Sabha located in Aurangabad district, Maharashtra.

It is a part of Aurangabad (Lok Sabha constituency) along with five other assembly constituencies viz Vaijapur, Gangapur, Aurangabad Central, Kannad and Aurangabad West (SC)

Members of Legislative Assembly

Key

Election results

Assembly Elections 2019

Assembly Elections 2014

Assembly Elections 2009

Assembly Elections 2004

References

1.ward’s Distribution map

https://in.docworkspace.com/d/sIE7Jq6we67fpmwY?sa=e1&st=0t
Assembly constituencies of Maharashtra
Government of Aurangabad, Maharashtra
Year of establishment missing